Jasmin Fritz (born 1996) is a German sprint canoeist.

She participated at the 2018 ICF Canoe Sprint World Championships, winning a medal.

References

Living people
1996 births
German female canoeists
ICF Canoe Sprint World Championships medalists in kayak
European Games competitors for Germany
Canoeists at the 2019 European Games